The 10th Cinemalaya Independent Film Festival, also billed as Cinemalaya X was held from August 1–10 of 2014 in Metro Manila, Philippines. The achievements of Cinemalaya over the past ten years are summed up in the festival's theme: A Decade of Connecting Dimensions. The theme highlights Cinemalaya as a flourishing network of individuals, groups and institutions with a common goal of developing and promoting Filipino independent filmmaking.

The festival was opened by Jose Antonio Vargas' Documented, a documentary film that chronicles his life living in America and his struggles as an undocumented immigrant. While the closing film was A Thief, a Kid and a Killer, a crime-drama film directed by American director Nathan Adolfson, starring Epi Quizon and Felix Roco.

At the awards ceremony held at the Cultural Center of the Philippines Tanghalang Nicanor Abelardo on August 10; both Bwaya and Kasal won four awards each. Their awards included Best Film and Best Cinematography in their respective categories.

Entries
The fifteen feature-film entries are divided into two separate competitions. The five feature-film entries will compete under the Directors Showcase which are presented by veteran film directors of the country. While the other ten feature-film entries will compete under the New Breed section which are presented by first-time or young filmmakers working today. The Short Film section has also ten competing entries.
The winning film is highlighted with boldface and a dagger.

Directors Showcase

New Breed

Short films

Awards
This year's Cinemalaya Independent Film Festival awards night was held Sunday night, August 10, at the Tanghalang Nicanor Abelardo (Main Theater) of the Cultural Center of the Philippines. Under the Director's Showcase category, Joselito Altarejos' Kasal, a slice-of-life drama of a gay couple, won the Best Film and was cited for its "deeply sensitive and moving depiction of the intricacies of relationships." While Francis Xavier Pasion's Bwaya won the Best Film of the New Breed selection and was cited  "for its melding of documentary and fictional filmmaking, its effective depiction of a community's efforts to come to grips with the horrible death of a young girl from a crocodile attack, and its powerful evocation of the marshes of Agusan in Mindanao, a vast wilderness where man and beast seek to maintain an ecology of cohabitation."

It is also the first time in Cinemalaya history to give the award of the Gawad Balanghai as a lifetime achievement award. Filipino filmmaker Kidlat Tahimik, dubbed as the "Father of Philippine Independent Cinema", was given the first Gawad Balanghai for he "has contributed to the development and promotion of Philippine independent cinema, we also take cognizance of the fact that there are many individuals and organizations that have likewise been instrumental to the rise of the independent film movement in our country."

Full-Length Features
Directors Showcase
 Best Film – Kasal by Joselito Altarejos
 Special Jury Prize – Hari ng Tondo by Carlos Siguion-Reyna
 Audience Choice Award – Hustisya by Joel Lamangan
 Best Direction – Mike Tuviera for The Janitor
 Best Actor – Robert Arevalo for Hari ng Tondo
 Best Actress – Nora Aunor for Hustisya
 Best Supporting Actor – Nicco Manalo for The Janitor
 Best Supporting Actress – Cris Villonco for Hari ng Tondo
 Best Screenplay – Aloy Adlawan and Mike Tuviera for The Janitor
 Best Cinematography – Mycko David for Kasal
 Best Editing – Tara Illenberger for The Janitor
 Best Sound – The Janitor
 Best Original Music Score – Richard Gonzales for Kasal
 Best Production Design – Harley Alcasid for Kasal

New Breed
 Best Film – Bwaya by Francis Xavier Pasion
 Special Jury Prize – K'na, the Dreamweaver by Ida Anita del Mundo
 Audience Choice Award – Sundalong Kanin by Janice O'Hara
 Best Direction – Giancarlo Abrahan for Dagitab
 Best Actor – Dante Rivero for 1st Ko Si 3rd
 Best Actress – Eula Valdes for Dagitab
 Best Supporting Actor – Miggs Cuaderno for Children's Show
 Best Supporting Actress – Barbie Forteza for Mariquina
 Special Jury Citation for Best Acting Ensemble - The cast of #Y (Sophie Albert, Coleen Garcia, Elmo Magalona, Chynna Ortaleza, and Kit Thompson)
 Best Screenplay – Giancarlo Abrahan for Dagitab
 Best Cinematography – Neil Daza for Bwaya
 Best Editing – Gerone Centeno for Children's Show
 Best Sound – Jonathan Hee and Bryan Dumaguina for Children's Show
 Best Original Music Score – Erwin Fajardo for Bwaya
 Best Production Design – Toym Imao for Kna, the Dreamweaver

Special Awards
Gawad Balanghai – Kidlat Tahimik
Canon Best Cinematography of the Festival - Mycko David for "Children's Show"
 NETPAC Award 
 Directors Showcase – Hustisya by Joel Lamangan
 New Breed – Bwaya by Francis Xavier Pasion

Short films
 Best Short Film – Asan si Lolo Me by Sari Estrada
 Special Jury Prize – The Ordinary Things We Do by David Corpuz
 Audience Choice Award – Lola by Kevin Ang
 Best Direction – Kevin Ang for Lola
 Best Screenplay – Kevin Ang for Lola

References

External links
Cinemalaya Independent Film Festival

Cinemalaya Independent Film Festival
Cine
Cine
2014 in Philippine cinema